This is a sortable list of countries and their total length of pipelines, mostly based on the CIA World Factbook, accessed in November 2015.

* indicates "Pipelines in COUNTRY or TERRITORY" links.

References

Pipelines